The Serra dos Órgãos ("Organ Range") is a mountain range in the state of Rio de Janeiro, Brazil. It contains the Serra dos Órgãos National Park.

Location

The Serra dos Órgãos is the name of the region of the Serra do Mar in the central part of the state of Rio de Janeiro.
The range is an escarpment on the northern edge of the Guanabara Graben between the cities of Petrópolis and Teresópolis.
The name comes from perceived resemblance of the vertical rock formations created by erosion to the tubes of organs used in Portuguese churches at the time.

Topology

A north west fracture is exposed at the plateau's rock surfaces, which defines the direction of the ridges and valleys along the escarpment.
One of these ridges contains several granite peaks including God's Finger.
North east vertical fractures, spaced regularly about every , cut the north west structures at right angles.
Erosion along these fractures has isolated the massive rock blocks.
The valleys have well-preserved deposits of debris that has fallen from the rock walls.
In November 1981 a period of intense rain triggered hundreds of shallow landslides and flows of debris that blocked the BR-116 highway and killed about 20 people.

Geology

The mountains consist of granitic gneisses of the Neoproterozoic era. 
The region is structurally complex with considerable faulting combined with erosion.
The ridge containing the God's Finger and other towers is unusual in being sustained by a thick dike of Cambrian granite that is more resistant to erosion than the surrounding Neoproterozoic orthogneisses.
Formation of the rocks may have occurred around 620 million years ago.

See also
 Pedra da Gávea
 Sugarloaf Mountain and Urca Hill Natural Monument

Notes

Sources

Orgaos